Urgant is a Nordic surname. Notable people with the surname include:

Ivan Urgant (born 1978), Russian television host, presenter, actor, musician, and producer
Evening Urgant, Russian talk show hosted by Ivan Urgant 
Nina Urgant (1929–2021), Russian actress, grandmother of Ivan

Surnames of European origin